α-Endopsychosin is an antagonist of the phencyclidine site of the NMDA receptor which was discovered in extracts of porcine brain and may also be endogenous in humans. The compound appears to be a peptide, but has yet to be purified and fully characterized.

See also
 N,N-Dimethyltryptamine
 N-Acetylaspartylglutamic acid
 Ketamine
 Phencyclidine

References

Neuropeptides
Neurotransmitters
NMDA receptor antagonists